Michele Sutto (born 11 February 1986) is an Italian rugby union player. His usual position is as a Lock and he currently plays for Mogliano in Top12.

In 2014–15 Pro12 and 2015–16 Pro14 seasons, he was named Additional Player for Zebre.

References

External links 
Eurosport Profile
It's Rugby England Profile

1986 births
Living people
Rugby union locks